Vincenzo Cerundolo  (20 December 1959 – 7 January 2020) was the Director of the Medical Research Council (MRC) Human Immunology Unit at the University of Oxford, at the John Radcliffe Hospital and a Professor of Immunology at the University of Oxford. He was also a Supernumerary Fellow at Merton College, Oxford. He was known for his discoveries in processing and presentation of cancer and viral peptides to T cells and lipids to invariant NKT cells. Cerundolo died of lung cancer on 7 January 2020.

Early life and education 

Vincenzo Cerundolo was born in Lecce (Italy) on 20 December 1959 to Vittorio Cerundolo and Colomba Vissicchio. He went to school at Liceo Scientifico De Giorgi (Lecce) and then to the University of Padua to study Medicine (1979-1984). He went on to complete a higher degree at the University of Padua at the Institute of Oncology supervised by Dino Collavo and Paola Zanovello.

Career and research 
After his studies at the University of Padua, Cerundolo completed his postdoctoral research with Professor Alain Townsend at the Weatherall Institute of Molecular Medicine, at the University of Oxford. He was first to demonstrate that TAP genes located within the major histocompatibility complex (MHC) transport peptides presented by MHC class I molecules and describe a novel clinical syndrome in patients with defective TAP genes. He characterised the relationship between the length of peptides and their binding affinity to MHC class I molecules, explaining the homogeneous length of peptides isolated from MHC class I molecules. He characterised the structural and kinetic mechanisms by which lipids bind to CD1 molecules and are recognized by T cells and demonstrated that harnessing CD1 restricted Natural killer T cell (NKT) cells enhances antigen specific antibody and T cell responses.

Cerundolo became Director of the MRC Human Immunology Unit in 2010.

Publications 
His publications include:
 Cerundolo, V., J. Alexander, K. Anderson, C. Lamb, P.     Cresswell, A. McMichael, F. Gotch, and A. Townsend. 1990. Presentation of     viral antigen controlled by a gene in the major histocompatibility     complex. Nature 345:449-452.
 Moins-Teisserenc, H.T., S.D. Gadola, M. Cella,     P.R. Dunbar, A. Exley, N. Blake, C. Baykal, J. Lambert, P. Bigliardi, M.     Willemsen, M. Jones, S. Buechner, M. Colonna, W.L. Gross, and V.     Cerundolo. 1999. Association of a syndrome resembling Wegener's     granulomatosis with low surface expression of HLA class-I molecules. Lancet     354:1598-1603.
 Cerundolo V, Elliott T, Elvin J, Bastin J, Rammensee HG,     Townsend A. The binding affinity and dissociation rates of peptides for     class I major histocompatibility complex molecules. 1991. Eur J     Immunol, 21:2069-75.
 Romero, P., P.R. Dunbar, D. Valmori, M.     Pittet, G.S. Ogg, D. Rimoldi, J.L. Chen, D. Lienard, J.C. Cerottini, and V.     Cerundolo. 1998. Ex vivo staining of metastatic lymph nodes by class I     major histocompatibility complex tetramers reveals high numbers of     antigen-experienced tumor-specific cytolytic T lymphocytes. J Exp Med     188:1641-1650.
 Gileadi U,  Moins-Teisserenc HT, Correa     I, Booth B Jr, Dunbar PR, Sewell AK, Trowsdale J, Phillips RE, Cerundolo     V.  1999. Generation of an Immunodominant CTL epitope is affected     by proteasome subunit composition and stability of the antigenic protein. J     Immunol, 163:6045-6052.
 Palmowski MJ, Gileadi U, Salio M, Gallimore A,     Millrain M, James E, Addey C, Scott D, Dyson J, Simpson E, Cerundolo V.     2006. Role of Immunoproteasomes in cross-presentation. J Immunol,      177: 983-990.
 Chen, J.-L., G. Stewart-Jones, G. Bossi, M.N.     Lissin, L. Wooldridge, E. Choi, G. Held, P.R. Dunbar, R. Esnouf, M. Sami,     J.M. Boulter, P. Rizkallah, C. Renner, A. Sewell, P.A. van der Merwe, B.K.     Jakobsen, G. Griffiths, E. Jones, and V. Cerundolo. 2005.     Structural and kinetic basis for heightened immunogenicity of T-cell     vaccines. J. Exp. Medicine  201:1243-1255.
 Palmowski, M., Choi, E., Hermans, I., Gilbert,     S., Chen, J-L., Gileadi, U., Salio, M., Van Pel, A., Man, S., Bonin, E.,     Liljestrom P., Dunbar, P.R., Cerundolo, V. 2002. Competition     between cytotoxic T lymphocytes narrows the immune response induced by     prime-boost vaccination protocols.  J Immunol, 168: 4391-4398.
 Gadola, S.D., N.R. Zaccai, K. Harlos, D.     Shepherd, J.C. Castro-Palomino, G. Ritter, R.R. Schmidt, E.Y. Jones, and V.     Cerundolo. 2002. Structure of human CD1b with bound ligands at 2.3 Å,     a maze for alkyl chains. Nature Immunol 3:721-726.
 Koch, M., V.S. Stronge, D. Shepherd, S.D.     Gadola, B. Mathew, G. Ritter, A.R. Fersht, G.S. Besra, R.R. Schmidt, E.Y.     Jones, and V. Cerundolo. 2005. The crystal structure of human CD1d     with and without alpha-galactosylceramide. Nature Immunol     6:819-826.
 McCarthy, C., D. Shepherd, S. Fleire, V.S.     Stronge, M. Koch, P.A. Illarionov, G. Bossi, M. Salio, G. Denkberg, F.     Reddington, A. Tarlton, B.G. Reddy, R.R. Schmidt, Y. Reiter, G.M.     Griffiths, P.A. van der Merwe, G.S. Besra, E.Y. Jones, F.D. Batista, and V.     Cerundolo. 2007. The length of lipids bound to human CD1d molecules     modulates the affinity of NKT cell TCR and the threshold of NKT cell     activation. J Exp Med 204:1131-1144.
 Hermans, I.F., J.D. Silk, U. Gileadi, M.     Salio, B. Mathew, G. Ritter, R. Schmidt, A.L. Harris, L. Old, and V.     Cerundolo. 2003. NKT cells enhance CD4+ and CD8+ T cell responses to     soluble antigen in vivo through direct interaction with dendritic cells. J     Immunol 171:5140-5147.
 Silk, J. Hermans, I, Gileadi, U., Chong, W.,     Shepherd,D., Salio, M., Mathew, B., Schmidt, R.R., Lunt, S. Williams, K.,     Stratford, I., Harris A.,  and Cerundolo V. 2004. Utilizing     the adjuvant properties of CD1d-dependent NKT cells in T cell-mediated     immunotherapy.  J Clinical Investigation.  114:1800-1811.

Awards and honours 
 Elected a Fellow of the Royal Society (FRS) in 2018

Personal life 
Married in 1987, Cerundolo had one daughter and one son.

References

Fellows of the Royal Society
Fellows of the Academy of Medical Sciences (United Kingdom)
Fellows of Merton College, Oxford
Physicians of the John Radcliffe Hospital
University of Padua alumni
1959 births
2020 deaths
Deaths from lung cancer